Captive is an American documentary web series that was released on Netflix on December 9, 2016. The series consisted of eight episodes, and explored hostage situations and negotiations around the world.

Episodes

References

External links
 
 Captive on Netflix

English-language Netflix original programming
True crime television series
2016 American television series debuts
2016 American television series endings
2010s American documentary television series